District School No. 3 is a historic one-room school building located at Castleton-on-Hudson in Rensselaer County, New York.  It was built in 1870 and is a one-story, rectangular massed, brick building in the Italianate style.  It remained in use as a school until 1951.  Also on the property is a gable roofed garage (1931), a coal / wood shed, and a stone capped well.

It was listed on the National Register of Historic Places in 1998.

References

One-room schoolhouses in New York (state)
School buildings on the National Register of Historic Places in New York (state)
Italianate architecture in New York (state)
School buildings completed in 1870
Buildings and structures in Rensselaer County, New York
National Register of Historic Places in Rensselaer County, New York